Gary Johnson (born 1953) is the former governor of New Mexico and candidate for U.S. president in 2012 and 2016.

Gary Johnson may also refer to:

Politics
Gary Johnson (Wisconsin politician) (1939–2008), American politician, Wisconsin State Assembly
Gary Johnson, candidate in the United States House of Representatives elections in Louisiana, 2010
W. Gary Johnson, Libertarian candidate in the New York gubernatorial election, 1990

Sports
Gary "Big Hands" Johnson (1952–2010), American football player
Gary Johnson (footballer, born 1955), English football player and manager
Gary Johnson (footballer, born 1959), English football player
Gary Johnson (rugby union) (born 1984), London Irish rugby union player
Gary Johnson (manager) (1938–2012), baseball manager and scout who also played in the minor leagues
Gary Johnson (outfielder) (born 1975), Major League Baseball player

Other
Garry Johnson (born 1937), British military general
Gary R. Johnson, American academic
Gary L. Johnson, American scientist

See also
Gary Johnston, Australian rules footballer
Gary W. Johnston (1964-2022), United States Army general